The Ryan XV-8 Flexible Wing Aerial Utility Vehicle (nicknamed Fleep, short for "Flying Jeep") was an improved version of the Flex-Wing. Both aircraft were built by Ryan Aeronautical Company in collaboration with NASA for the United States Air Force and the United States Army and tested in 1961 as a STOL patrol, reconnaissance, and light utility aircraft to transport people or freight when a more specialized aircraft is not required or available.

Design and development 

The Fleep began as the Flex-Wing.  The Flex-Wing had four-wheel landing gear, a smaller nose section behind which the pilot sat, and a single vertical tail/rudder.

The Fleep had tricycle landing gear, a larger nose section and a V tail/rudder. The wing was a fabric delta-shaped Rogallo wing with a foldable frame; the wing was attached to a pod-like cockpit on a four-wheeled cargo platform. It was tested with two tail configurations — vertical fin and V-tail. The aircraft wing could be folded into a relatively small package for transport.

Specifications

See also

References

FLEXIBLE WINGS AT WORK

External links

 Popular Mechanics article by Ryan test pilot Lou Everett

V-8, Ryan
Tailless delta-wing aircraft
XV-8
Parafoils
Single-engined pusher aircraft